Girls' time trial was part of the cycling at the 2010 Summer Youth Olympics program. It was held on 22 August 2010 at The Float at Marina Bay. This was not an official individual event and therefore medals were not given. However the performance of the athletes provided points towards the Combined Mixed Team event for cycling.

Results 
The race began at approximately 9:00 a.m. (UTC+8) on 22 August at The Float at Marina Bay.

References 

 Results

Cycling at the 2010 Summer Youth Olympics
2010 in women's road cycling